Luther Blissett is a multiple-use name, an "open pop star" informally adopted and shared by hundreds of artists and activists all over Europe and the Americas since 1994. The pseudonym first appeared in Bologna, Italy, in mid-1994, when a number of cultural activists began using it for staging a series of urban and media pranks and to experiment with new forms of authorship and identity. From Bologna the multiple-use name spread to other European cities, such as Rome and London, as well as countries such as Germany, Spain, and Slovenia. Sporadic appearances of Luther Blissett have been also noted in Canada, the United States, Finland, and Brazil.

For reasons that remain unknown, though according to one former member the decision was based purely on the perceived comic value of the name, the pseudonym was borrowed from a real-life Luther Blissett, a notable association football player, who played for A.C. Milan, Watford F.C. and England in the 1980s. In December 1999, the Italian activists who had launched the Luther Blissett Project in 1994 decided to discontinue usage of the name by committing symbolic ritual suicide, or seppuku. After authoring the best-selling historic novel Q as "Luther Blissett", five of them went on to found the writers' collective Wu Ming.

Luther Blissett's mythmaking and politics
While the folk heroes of the early-modern period and the nineteenth century served a variety of social and political purposes, the Luther Blissett Project (LBP) were able to utilize the media and communication strategies unavailable to their predecessors. According to Marco Deseriis, the main purpose of the LBP was to create "a folk hero of the information society" whereby knowledge workers and immaterial workers could organize and recognize themselves. Luther Blissett became a positive mythic figure that was supposed to embody the very process of community and cross-media storytelling rather than being understood only as a media prankster and culture jammer. Roberto Bui, one of the co-founders of the LBP and Wu Ming, explains the function of Luther Blissett and other radical folk heroes as mythmaking or mythopoesis:

Mythopoesis is the social process of constructing myths, by which we do not mean "false stories," we mean stories that are told and shared, re-told and manipulated, by a vast and multifarious community, stories that may give shape to some kind of ritual, some sense of continuity between what we do and what other people did in the past. A tradition. In Latin the verb "tradere" simply meant "to hand down something," it did not entail any narrow-mindedness, conservatism or forced respect for the past. Revolutions and radical movements have always found and told their own myths.

Another important element was relationship of the Italian LBP to the autonomist-Marxist theory of labor known as workerism. Drawing from the work of Italian workerists, such as Antonio Negri, Paolo Virno, Maurizio Lazzarato and others, the activists of the LBP envisioned Blissett as the expression of the capacity of immaterial workers to produce forms of wealth that cannot be properly measured and attributed to an individual producer. The incalculability of these new forms of labor is articulated in the "Declaration of Rights of Luther Blissett", redacted by the Roman LBP in 1995. In this manifesto, the LBP claims that because in late capitalism any social activity can potentially generate value, the culture and media industries should guarantee a basic income to every citizen detached from individual productivity:

The industry of the integrated spectacle and immaterial command owes me money. I will not come to terms with it until I will not have what is owed to me. For all the times I appeared on TV, films, and on the radio as a casual passersby or as an element of the landscape, and my image has not been compensated . . . for all the words or expressions of high communicative impact I have coined in peripheral cafes, squares, street corners, and social centers that became powerful advertising jingles, without seeing a dime; for all the times my name and my personal data have been put at work inside
stats, to adjust the demand, refine marketing strategies, increase the productivity of firms to which I could not be more indifferent; for all the advertising I continuously make by wearing branded t-shirts, backpacks, socks, jackets, bathing suits, towels, without my body being remunerated as a commercial billboard; for all of this and much more, the industry of the integrated spectacle owes me money! I understand it may be difficult to calculate how much they owe me as an individual. But this is not necessary at all, because I am Luther Blissett, the multiple and the multiplex.
And what the industry of the integrated spectacle owes me, it is owed to the many that I am, and is owed to me because I am many. From this viewpoint, we can agree on a generalized compensation. You will not have peace until I will not have the money! LOTS OF MONEY BECAUSE I AM MANY: CITIZEN INCOME FOR LUTHER BLISSETT!

Limited selection of Blissett's stunts, pranks, and media hoaxes
 January 1995 — Harry Kipper, a British conceptual artist, disappears at the Italo-Slovenian border while touring Europe on a mountain bike, allegedly with the purpose of tracing the word ART on the map of the continent. The victim of the prank is a famous missing-persons prime-time show on the Italian state television. They send out a TV crew to look for a person that never existed. They go as far as London, where novelist Stewart Home and Richard Essex of the London Psychogeographical Association pose as close friends of Kipper's. The hoax goes on until "Luther Blissett" claims responsibility for it.
 September 1994–May 1995 — In September 1994, a Bolognese community radio began broadcasting Radio Blissett, a late-night show featuring a variable number of Luther Blissetts who "patrolled" the city on foot and called the studio from local phone booths. Inspired by the Lettrist-Situationist urban drift or dérive—a seemingly aimless wandering through the city whereby psychogeographers go in search of heightened emotional experiences—Radio Blissett allowed players to interact at a distance in real time.  Listeners could also call in from home and direct the patrols to various locations to join or create unexpected social events, including guerrilla-theater interventions, street parties, three-sided football matches, and "psychic attacks" against public buildings and institutions. In the Spring 1995, the experiment was duplicated in Rome, where the wider extension of the city required the simultaneous use of car patrols and cell phones. The Saturday night show, which aired on the frequencies of Radio Città Futura, featured psychic attacks against the Italian copyright office, the office of employment, and other semi-improvised direct actions which culminated in one of the most well-known episodes of the Blissett’s saga.
 17 June 1995 – A few dozen participating in the Roman Radio Blissett boarded a night tram at different consecutive stops. A rave party took place on the vehicle until the police decided to stop it. Requested to disembark and identify themselves, the ravers refused to identify themselves other than with the multiple-use name. A riot ensued in which the police fired three shots in the air. A journalist from Radio Citta' Futura covered the event with his cell phone broadcasting the riot and the shots on the radio program. The radio program caused a media sensation.
 June 1995 — Loota is a female chimpanzee whose paintings are to be exhibited at the Venice Biennale of Contemporary Arts. In the context of the hoax, Loota is described as a former victim of sadistic experiments in a pharmaceutical lab. The ape was then saved by the Animal Liberation Front, and later became a talented artist. Some newspapers announced the event. However, Loota did not exist.
 November 1995 — An article in the  "Workshop For A Non-Linear Architecture"  journal Viscosity stating that the K Foundation had announced a 23-year moratorium on "all further activity" following their burning of a million pounds in cash on the Isle of Jura is credited to Luther Blissett.
 1998–2000 — In 1998, Italian art magazines such as Tema Celeste and Flesh Art begin reporting about the activities of Darko Maver, a hitherto unknown radical Serbian performance artist who has been disseminating hyper-realistic replicas of dismembered bodies in public spaces and hotel rooms across the former Yugoslavia. The magazines and a web site called "Free Art Campaign" report that the artist has been arrested by the Serbian authorities for his performances, which are meant to offer a scathing meditation on the hyperreality and media representation of the Yugoslav Wars. On 30 April 1999 the Free Art Campaign announces that Maver has been found dead in a prison cell in Podgorica, Montenegro. In March 2000, after alternative art spaces such as Kapelica Gallery in Ljubljana, Forte Prenestino in Rome, and major art venues such as the Venice Biennale have dedicated retrospectives and paid tribute to the artist, the Luther Blissett Project, along with the newborn net art collective 0100101110101101.org, announce that Darko Maver is himself a work of art.
 2007 — A month before the appearance on the bookshelves of Harry Potter and the Deathly Hallows, an email was sent to the Full Disclosure mailing list. In the e-mail, a self-declared group of Catholic hackers purportedly gave away the ending of the book, declaring they violated the computer systems of Bloomsbury (exclusive publisher of the Harry Potter books) to obtain it. The e-mail quoted Joseph Ratzinger's words against Harry Potter. The news escalated from niche IT security mailing lists to mainstream media outlets, and in about 48 hours, it was run by CNN, BBC, Reuters, and over 9000 blogs (declared in the claim). Three days after, Luther Blissett claimed responsibility for the hoax in a public email in which he described how easily the media could be manipulated and how this could be used for psyops purposes. The revelation was ignored by most media outlets, with the notable exception of Noticiasdot, which published an interview with Luther Blissett. The psyop may be the cause of the 5% drop of Bloomsbury Publishing PLC stock quoted on the London Stock Exchange.

Q

The novel Q was written by four Bologna-based members of the LBP (Roberto Bui, Giovanni Cattabriga, Federico Guglielmi and Luca Di Meo), as a final contribution to the project, and published in Italy in 1999. So far, it has been translated into English (British and American), Spanish, German, Dutch, French, Portuguese (Brazilian), Danish, Polish, Greek, Czech, Russian, Turkish, Basque, Serbian and Korean. In August 2003 the book was nominated for the Guardian First Book Prize.

In January 2000, after their "seppuku", the authors of Q formed a new group called Wu Ming (Chinese for "nameless"), under which name many novels were published in several languages and countries.

Real Luther Blissett

The multiple identity is named after the association footballer Luther Blissett, who used to play for Watford F.C. and A.C. Milan in the 1980s, among other teams. It is particularly popular among Italian subcultural activists and artists, possibly because of the Milan connection. The reasons the group chose the name remain unclear to mainstream journalists (e.g. the BBC suggested that Blissett, one of the first black footballers to play in Italy, may have been chosen to make a statement against right-wing extremists in the country). It has also been suggested that, when being scouted by A. C. Milan, the Watford player they were impressed with was in fact John Barnes and they mistakenly bid for Blissett being one of the two black strikers at the club. If this is the case, the group may have taken the name as a reference to a red herring.

Since the beginning of the project, the real Blissett has been aware of the group taking his name. However, early reports differed widely in saying whether he liked the attention he received because of them. On 30 June 2004 he appeared on the British television sports show Fantasy Football League - Euro 2004, broadcast on ITV, and joked about his own (alleged) involvement in the Luther Blissett Project. After host Frank Skinner read a line from the novel Q prologue ("The coin of the kingdom of the mad dangles on my chest to remind me of the eternal oscillation of human fortunes"), Blissett produced a copy of Luther Blissett's Italian book Totò, Peppino e la guerra psichica (Toto, Peppino and the psychic war) and quoted extensively from it, in the original Italian: "Chiunque può essere Luther Blissett, semplicemente adottando il nome Luther Blissett" (Anyone can be Luther Blissett simply by adopting the name Luther Blissett). At the end of the show, hosts and guests all said in unison: "I am Luther Blissett!" Two years later, highlights of this broadcast were posted on YouTube.

Works
 Mind Invaders (Italian, 1995).
 "Guy Debord è morto davvero" (Italian, 1995; English edition: "Guy Debord is Really Dead")
 Totò, Peppino e la guerra psichica 2.0 (Toto, Peppino and the psychic war), AAA edition, 1996, 
 Green Apocalypse (with Stewart Home, 1996)
 Anarchist Integralism (1997)
 Handbuch der Kommunikationsguerilla ("Handbook of a Communications Fighter", German, 1997, with autonome a.f.r.i.k.a. gruppe and Sonja Brünzels)
 Q (Italian, 1999)
 Luther Blissett - The Open Pop Star (Italian, 1999 compilation album of electronic / experimental music by various artists)
 The Invisible College (2002)
 Numerous software recipes in the Python Cookbook edited by Alex Martelli and published by O'Reilly and Associates

See also
54 (novel)
Eva and Franco Mattes
Wu Ming

References

External links
Luther Blissett Project website (archives 1994-1999)
"Lots of Money Because I am Many: The Luther Blissett Project and the Multiple-Use Name Strategy" - long essay by Marco Deseriis on the birth, life, and death of the Italian Luther Blissett Project.
A very extensive and detailed interview with Wu Ming 1 and Wu Ming 2 (ex-Blissetts from Bologna) about the Luther Blissett Project, conducted by professor Henry Jenkins and published on his blog in two installments, 1 and 2.
Wu Ming Foundation - the authors of Luther Blissett's Q
Luther Blissett Myspace page featuring Blissett-to-Blissett interview in blog
lutherblissett - a comic book artist tries on the name
 Luther Blissett journals and books digitized by Archive Grafton9 are freely available on archive.org

Anonymity pseudonyms
International artist groups and collectives
20th-century Italian novelists
20th-century male writers
Psychogeographers
Culture jamming
Neoism
Lists of practical jokes
Hoaxers